The men's 200 metres event at the 2007 Asian Athletics Championships was held in Amman, Jordan on July 27–28.

Medalists

Results

Heats
Wind: Heat 1: +2.2 m/s, Heat 2: +1.8 m/s, Heat 3: +1.2 m/s

Final
Wind: +0.8 m/s

References
Heats results
Final results

2007 Asian Athletics Championships
200 metres at the Asian Athletics Championships